Saint-Doulchard is a commune in the Cher department in the Centre-Val de Loire region of France. It is on the outskirts of Bourges.

History
In Roman times, it was named Ampeliacum, which literally means "the vineyard hillsides", where they grew grapes.

In the Middle Ages, it was home to Dulcardus, a hermit monk who gave his name to the place - St. Doulchard, by then just a village with a small church and bell tower.

With the introduction of railways in the nineteenth century and the Michelin tyre factory in 1950, the commune has grown, attracting businesses, jobs and an ever increasing population.

Geography
An area of both farming and light industry comprising a small suburban town and several hamlets situated along the banks of the Yèvre and the canal de Berry, immediately to the west of Bourges at the junction of the D104 with the D60 and the N76 with the D400 road.

Population

Sights
 The church, dating from the eleventh century.
 The chateau of Varye, built in 1870, and its park.
 The fifteenth-century manorhouse and mill at Ouzy.

Personalities 
 Philippe-Ernest Legrand, French Hellenist was born here in 1866.
 Bernard Diomède, French footballer was born here in 1974.
 William Bonnet, French racing cyclist was born here in 1982.
 Loïc Jacquet, French rugby union player was born here in 1985.
 Morgan Sanson, French footballer was born here in 1994.

International relations
Saint-Doulchard is twinned with:
 Darłowo, Poland

See also
Communes of the Cher department

References

External links

Official website of Saint Doulchard 

Communes of Cher (department)